Uttoxeter is a market town and civil parish in East Staffordshire, England, near to the Derbyshire county border. 

The population was 13,089 at the 2011 Census.

The town's literary connections include Samuel Johnson and Mary Howitt.

History

Uttoxeter's name has been spelt at least 79 ways since it appeared in the Domesday Book of 1086 as "Wotocheshede": it probably came from Anglo-Saxon Wuttuceshǣddre, meaning "Wuttuc's homestead on the heath". Some historians have pointed to pre-Roman settlement here; axes from the Bronze Age discovered in the town are now on display in the Potteries Museum in Stoke-on-Trent. It is possible that Uttoxeter was the location of some form of Roman activity, due to its strategic position on the River Dove and its closeness to the large garrison forts at Rocester between 69 and 400 AD, and the recently discovered fort at Stramshall. However, little corroborating archaeological evidence has been found.

Uttoxeter saw the last major royalist surrender of the English Civil War, on 25 August 1648, when James Hamilton, 1st Duke of Hamilton surrendered to Parliamentarian General John Lambert.

Perhaps the most famous historical event to have occurred in Uttoxeter is an act of penance by Samuel Johnson. Johnson's father ran a bookstall on Uttoxeter market, and young Samuel once refused to help out on the stall. When Johnson was older, he stood in the rain without a hat, as penance for his failure to assist his father. The event is commemorated by the Johnson Memorial, which stands in the town-centre Market Place. He is also remembered in the name of Johnson Road.

Mary Howitt, the Quaker writer of the poem "The Spider and the Fly", lived in Uttoxeter for a long period of her life. The town influenced some of her poems and novels and fuelled her love of natural history, which also featured in her books. Howitt Crescent, a residential road in the town, was named after her. The house where she lived, Howitt Place, is still standing in Balance Street.

Thomas Fradgley, Uttoxeter's own architect designed Uttoxeter Town Hall (1854), the Johnson Memorial (1854), St Michael's Church, Stramshall, St Lawrence Church, Bramshall (1835), St Mary's Church, Uttoxeter, and Marchington Church. He was involved with Pugin and other architects in designs for the 16th Earl of Shrewsbury at Alton Towers including the figures of the Talbot Hounds at the entrance tower (1830), the Angel Corbels in the Lady chapel, 1833, Alton Towers Chapel with Joseph Potter (completed in 1833), Swiss Cottage, and Harper's Cottage, Farley. He was the architect who improved several local schools, including Uttoxeter National School, Hanbury Free School (enlarged in 1848), national schools at Oakamoor, Cauldon, Alton, and Draycott School, Hanbury. He married Clara Warner from Bramshall. Their only child Thomas died aged six. Thomas Fradgley died in 1883 aged 83.

Bunting's brewery had occupied a large area of the centre of the town since the Victorian era. It ceased production in the 1930s after being bought by Parkers Brewery of Burslem, later part of Ind Coope. The remains of the brewery were demolished in the 1960s to make way for the Maltings shopping precinct and car park. The turret clock from the brewery, which had been languishing in the basement of the town hall, was refurbished and installed above the entrance to the Costa Coffee shop in the Carters Square Shopping Centre shortly before the centre opened in 2014.

In 2008, Uttoxeter marked the 700th anniversary of its market charter of 1308, which underpins the markets held on Saturdays and Wednesdays and on other festival days. The 1308 charter followed a more general Royal Charter granted to the town's burgesses in 1252. The originals are held at The National Archives in Kew and the Deferrers Museum in Leicester.

Economy
In 1945, Joseph Cyril Bamford founded J C Bamford Excavators Limited in Uttoxeter, now known as JCB. The firm, based in the nearby village of Rocester, is the world's third-largest construction equipment manufacturer. The firm's first vehicle was a tipping trailer made from war-surplus materials, which J. C. Bamford built in a rented lock-up garage in Uttoxeter. The Bamford family had previously started Bamfords, later Bamford International Farm Machinery which was a large employer in the town from the end of the 19th century through to the early 1980s, when it gradually declined before closing in 1989. The land and former building were acquired by JCB for its "Special Products" division. This has now closed and the buildings have been demolished, but the site has yet to be redeveloped. JCB has other factories in Uttoxeter, Cheadle, Rugeley, Foston and Wrexham, and abroad in the United States and India.

Fox's Biscuits (previously Elkes and Adams) has a factory in Uttoxeter. Elkes was the creator of the malted milk biscuit. Glennans Crisps, specialising in vegetable crisps, is based in the town. It was bought by Tyrrells Crisps in 2012.

Proximity to the Alton Towers Theme Park and Resort, St. George's Park National Football Centre and the Peak District National Park means tourism is important to the local economy. Uttoxeter Racecourse, home to the Midlands Grand National, also brings visitors, as do the town centre shops and markets.

Agriculture remains important, as the town is set in rich dairy farming country. Uttoxeter previously housed a large dairy and was historically a major trader in butter and cheese. The farming cooperative Dairy Farmers of Britain had another large dairy in the nearby village of Fole, but this closed in 2008. The next year the firm went into administration. A new cattle market was due to be built in the town after the old one was demolished in 2004, but no progress was made and it is now unlikely after ten years that the town will regain one.

Recent development

Uttoxeter town centre underwent a development scheme in 2006–2007, with the Market Place, Market Street, Queens Street, Carter Street, and High Street receiving new stone paving and street furniture.

Phased development of Dovefields Retail Park began in 1998 with a Tesco supermarket on the edge of the town and expansion in 2002 with seven large retail outlets. In 2005 an entertainment development with a bowling alley, an ice rink, a cinema, a children's crèche, a fitness centre and business units was built.

The old Cattle Market closed in November 2005 in favour of a retail and housing development, Carter Square, opening in 2014. This features a supermarket, a range of smaller retail units and a medical surgery.

The replacement cattle market, granted planning permission on the outskirts of the town, failed to appear after several years. A municipal recycling depot has opened on part of the site.

The JCB site in the centre of Uttoxeter was demolished in 2009 after the firm moved to one of its sites on the edge of town. This is currently undergoing redevelopment: a Waitrose store opened there in 2016. Plans have been approved for hundreds of homes, a park and business units.

Demography
According to the 2011 census, the population for Uttoxeter Civil Parish was 13,089. White British make up by far the largest ethnicity at 96% of the population, with only 493 people being from other ethnicities, the vast majority of which being Eastern Europeans.

Transport

Uttoxeter has a railway station, opened originally by the North Staffordshire Railway on 2 October 1881 to replace earlier stations. It is served by trains on the Crewe-Derby Line, which generally operate hourly each way between Crewe and Newark Castle.

The bus stop next to the station runs an hourly service to Cheadle, Stoke-on-Trent and Alton Towers. Buses to Stafford run every two hours, those to Burton upon Trent every hour.

The town is located on the main A50 trunk road between Stoke-on-Trent and Derby.

Uttoxeter was once the terminus of a branch of the Caldon Canal (the Uttoxeter Canal), but most signs of this, apart from an area of Uttoxeter called The Wharf, have disappeared; this is because much of the canal bed was used in the 19th century for the North Staffordshire Railway main line from Uttoxeter to Macclesfield, which has now also disappeared.

The nearest airport is East Midlands, some 29 miles (47 km) away.

Public services

Policing in Uttoxeter is provided from the Staffordshire Police station in Balance Street. HM Prison Dovegate, in the nearby village of Marchington, is a Category B men's private prison operated by the Serco. HM Prison Sudbury, just over six miles away beyond the Derbyshire boundary, is operated by HM Prison Service as a Category D men's open prison.

The statutory emergency fire and rescue service is provided by the Staffordshire Fire and Rescue Service. Uttoxeter Fire Station is in Cheadle Road in the north of the town.

Uttoxeter has no hospital. It is served by the nearby Queen's Hospital in Burton upon Trent, County Hospital in Stafford, University Hospital of North Staffordshire in Stoke-on-Trent and Royal Derby Hospital. There is no ambulance station, but a team of Rapid Response Paramedics is based here and supported by volunteer Community first responders.

The utility firm South Staffordshire Water manages Uttoxeter's drinking water and Severn Trent its waste water.

Places of interest

St Mary's Catholic Church in Balance Street was Pugin's first church design. He later worked on Alton Towers and the Houses of Parliament. Three miles north-west of Uttoxeter are the remains of Croxden Abbey, founded in 1176 by Bertram de Verdun for monks of the Cistercian Order. Redfern's Cottage Museum of Uttoxeter Life is in Carter Street and run by volunteers. The restored timber-framed building houses local-history displays, a small gift shop and a cafe.

The town's refurbished Market Place contains the town's main war memorial, as well as the Millennium Monument and the Dr Johnson Memorial. The Wednesday, Friday and Saturday markets are held weekly in the Market Place. In addition there is a monthly Makers' Market.

Smallwood Manor, just over a mile outside the town, was built in 1886 as a country house and now houses Smallwood Manor Preparatory School. The National Trust's Museum of Childhood is located at nearby Sudbury Hall.

Bramshall Road Park is the town's recreation ground, with offers tennis courts, skate park, basketball court, football pitch, bowling green and two children's play areas, as well as floral arrangements and the Picknall Brook nature reserve, which can be followed through to the River Dove.

The Peak District National Park is about 20 miles away.

The Uttoxeter Casket or Dr Nelson's Casket is an Anglo-Saxon reliquary, probably from Croxden Abbey. It was rediscovered in a cottage in Croxden in the mid-19th century. It probably held a religious relic for display on an altar. It is currently held at the Museum of Contemporary Art Cleveland, Ohio.

Media

Television
Uttoxeter lies within the BBC West Midlands and ITV Central both broadcast from the Sutton Coldfield transmitting station. It is also possible to receive BBC East Midlands from the Waltham transmitting station in Leicestershire.

Radio
Uttoxeter's local BBC station is BBC Radio Derby, based in Derby. Other local BBC stations that can be received include BBC Radio Stoke and BBC Radio Leicester.

Uttoxeter's commercial radio station is Imagine Radio, broadcasting on 101.8 FM locally. Other commercial stations that can be received include Gem, Capital Midlands and Signal 1.

Newspapers
Uttoxeter's newspapers are the Uttoxeter Advertiser (online only, part of the Burton Mail group of local papers), the Uttoxeter Echo, and the community magazine the Shire Standard.

Culture
Uttoxeter Civic Society was re-established in 2004 to act as a civic watchdog and to protect and promote the history and heritage of Uttoxeter.

Each year, Uttoxeter Lions run a beer festival in June, "Lark in the Park", at Bramshall Road Park on August bank holiday and on Bonfire and Fireworks Night in November, and an annual Christmas fair and market known as "Cracker Night".

Uttoxeter Choral Society was founded in 1881, as one of the earliest in the United Kingdom. Its continuity is matched by few other societies.

Uttoxeter is also the home of the Acoustic Festival of Britain.

Television appearances
Uttoxeter was the setting of a recurring comedy sketch by comedians Stephen Fry and Hugh Laurie in their BBC television series A Bit of Fry and Laurie. In one episode, two obnoxious business entrepreneurs who run various companies in Uttoxeter throughout the series develop grand plans for a popular sports centre. The sketch derives its humour from the fact that Uttoxeter is in fact a quiet and sedate town.

The town featured in Countryfile, as a "mystery town". Its cattle market featured in the programme as the last in the town centre site in 2005. Local people participated in the programme from the local Uttoxeter Advertiser and Uttoxeter Racecourse staff.

Oldfields Hall Middle School featured in the film A Room for Romeo Brass, written and directed by Shane Meadows and Paul Fraser, two Uxonians who have risen to fame.

Uttoxeter Racecourse has been used several times, as it is visited by residents of the popular soap Coronation Street.

Uttoxeter is the home of Rockin' Johnny Austin MBE, recognised for his charity work and rock and roll songs such as Rockabilly Stroll, a minor hit in the 1980s. He also produced in 2010 a World Cup Single, Victory Day, which was filmed on location in Uttoxeter Market Place.

Religion

St Mary the Virgin Church

The most prominent religious building in Uttoxeter is the Church of England St Mary the Virgin Church in Church Street. The present structure dates from 1877, but parts date from the 15th century. There is another Church of England church in The Heath area of the town. Both lie in the parish of Uttoxeter and the Diocese of Lichfield.

St Mary's Catholic Church
The Roman Catholic church in the town is St Mary's, dating from 1838 and designed by Augustus Pugin. It is part of the Roman Catholic Archdiocese of Birmingham.

Other Christian churches
Uttoxeter has a Methodist church dating from 1812, a United Reformed church in Carter Street, a Pentecostal Church, a Free Church, and a Kingdom Hall for Jehovah's Witnesses.

Non-Christian
The nearest mosques and Sikh Gurdwara are in Burton upon Trent, and the nearest synagogue is in Newcastle-under-Lyme. There is however a small prayer room near the town off Derby Road used by multiple faiths.

Quaker Meeting House
The Uttoxeter Meeting House in Carter Street was built in 1706 and remained in use until the late 1880s. However, it reopened in 1922 and has remained in use since then.

Education
Uttoxeter has a three-tier schooling system: several first schools, three middle schools (Oldfields Hall Middle School, Windsor Park Middle School and Ryecroft Middle School, Rocester) and a high school. All three middle schools were rated Good by Ofsted in 2015–2016. The high school was named as one of the top 10 per cent of schools nationally for Progress at GCSE in 2015. Thomas Alleyne's, has over 1,100 pupils, an astroturf football pitch, swimming pool, gymnasium and several grass football pitches. It is the only high school in Staffordshire to offer a school farm. It includes a sixth form centre, and is one of three schools founded by the 16th-century priest Thomas Alleyne.

Before this educational structure, the town had a selective secondary and grammar-school system consisting of Windsor Park Boys' School, Oldfields Girls' School and Alleyne's Grammar School.

The University of Derby and Staffordshire University (Stoke-on-Trent and Stafford) are the closest higher education institutions.

Sport
Uttoxeter is the home town of Olympic gold medal-winning swimming star Adam Peaty, world record holder for the 50m and 100m breast stroke. In January 2015 he opened the redeveloped Uttoxeter Leisure Centre, which now houses the Adam Peaty swimming pool.

Uttoxeter Racecourse, a short walk from the town centre, is home to the annual Midlands Grand National horse race.

Uttoxeter Rugby Club was formed in 1982, when JCB Rugby club began to play at Oldfields sport and social club in Uttoxeter, establishing the first rugby side in a town traditionally associated with association football. In those days there was no league structure in place nationally and so Uttoxeter played friendly fixtures and developed rivalries with other local sides such as Cannock and Rugeley, which have lasted over the last 30 years.

Uttoxeter's football club, Uttoxeter Town F.C., is also based at Oldfields sports and social club. It has been successful for many years in the Burton and District Sunday Football League. Rocester F.C. plays in the nearby village of Rocester.

Uttoxeter's Manor golf course is a short walk from the town, three miles out near the village of Kingstone.

Uttoxeter Leisure Centre in Oldfields Road has a swimming pool, gym and sports hall.

Uttoxeter Rifle Club is a Home Office-approved club based in the village of Denstone. It regularly shoots on the 30-yard outdoor cadet range at Denstone College and at longer-range facilities at Catton Park and Diggle.

Notable people
In order of birth:
Thomas Alleyne (c. 1488–1558) was a priest who founded schools such as Thomas Alleyne's High School Uttoxeter. and Alleyne's Academy in Stone.
Thomas Blagrave (died 1590) was acting Master of the Revels in 1573–1579.
Thomas Allen (1542–1632), English mathematician and astrologer was born in the town.  
Sir Simon Degge, (1612–1703) antiquary, wrote notes on Plot's Natural History of Staffordshire.
Robert Bakewell, (1682–1752) artist and metal worker, was born in the town.
Admiral Lord Gardner (1742–1809), who commanded a younger Nelson, was born at the manor house in the town.
Samuel March Phillipps (1780–1862) was a civil servant, legal writer and Under-Secretary of State for the Home Department from 1827 to 1848.
Samuel Bentley (1785–1868) English printer and antiquarian.
Thomas Kynnersley (1839–1874), naval officer and later MP in New Zealand, was born in town.
Lewis Hall (1860–1933) became a dental surgeon and politician in British Columbia, Canada.
Joseph Cyril Bamford (1916–2001), industrialist founder of JCB, was born at what is now the Parks.
Peter Vaughan (1923–2016) television and film actor, lived in the town and attended Uttoxeter Grammar School.
Dave Sampson (1941–2014), a rock singer, was born in the town.
Anthony Bamford (born 1945), a billionaire industrialist and Ferrari collector, son of Joseph Cyril Bamford, was born in Uttoxeter.
Ruth Gledhill, (born 1959) journalist, lived in Gratwich and attended Thomas Alleyne's High School.
Shane Meadows (born 1972), writer and film director known for This Is England, was born and brought up in Uttoxeter.

Sport
Vincent Blore (1908–1997), football goalkeeper, played for the Uttoxeter, Aston Villa, Burton Town, Derby County, West Ham, Crystal Palace and Exeter clubs.
Bartley Gorman (1944–2002), bare-knuckle boxer, lived for many years in the town.
Gary Croft (born 1974), footballer, grew up here and attended Alleynes. He was the first English footballer to play whilst wearing an electronic tag.
Jason Beardsley (born 1989), footballer for Notts County F.C.
Adam Peaty (born 1994) is a world record holder for the 50 m and 100 m breast stroke and Olympic gold medallist.

See also
Dovegate Prison

References

Bibliography

External links

Uttoxeter.biz, Local Community Website

 
Towns in Staffordshire
Market towns in Staffordshire
Civil parishes in Staffordshire
Borough of East Staffordshire